Robert J. Anderson (1914 – July 24, 1999) was the chief of the Communicable Disease Center (CDC) of the United States Public Health Service, forerunner to the modern Centers for Disease Control and Prevention, from October 1, 1956, to June 30, 1960.

Anderson was born in Zumbrota, Minnesota, graduated from Carleton College, and attended medical school at the University of Minnesota. After medical school he joined the Public Health Service. As an intern he worked at the Staten Island Public Health Service Hospital, including a stint in the venereal disease unit during World War II alongside John Friend Mahoney.

After studying public health at Columbia University under a Rockefeller fellowship, Anderson worked on tuberculosis control. In 1947 he became the chief of the Tuberculosis Control program at the Public Health Service. He left the tuberculosis program in 1956 to become head of the Communicable Disease Center. At the CDC, Anderson oversaw the building of the Atlanta campus.

After the CDC, Anderson returned to Washington, DC and worked on environmental health, including as Chief of the Bureau of State Services.

He retired from the Public Health Service in 1966. After retirement, he served as medical director of the American Thoracic Society and (from 1970 to 1974) managing director of a forerunner to the American Lung Association.

Anderson died of an aortic aneurysm on July 24, 1999, at his home in Arlington, Virginia, at the age of 85.

Selected works

References

Directors of the Centers for Disease Control and Prevention
1999 deaths
Carleton College alumni
University of Minnesota Medical School alumni
People from Zumbrota, Minnesota
Eisenhower administration personnel
1914 births